The London and North Western Railway (LNWR) Class C was a class of 0-8-0 steam locomotives.  They were two cylinder simple expansion rebuilds of the three-cylinder Class A designed by F.W. Webb.  Fifteen Class As (16 according to the LNWR Society) were converted to Class C between 1904 and 1906 by George Whale.

Class C1

The Class A boilers proved inadequate for the 19½ inch bore cylinders of the Class C so the next 34 Class A conversions were to Class C1 with 18½ inch bore cylinders.

Numbering
All passed into LMS ownership in 1923, and the LMS allocated them the numbers 8953-67, though not all were applied before withdrawal.

Rebuilding
The LMS rebuilt five of the Class Cs (LMS Nos 8953/4/62/4/6) to Class G1 between 1925-1927.

Withdrawal
The remaining 10 engines were withdrawn between 1927 and 1932. None were preserved.

References

Further reading
 
 
 

0-8-0 locomotives
C
Railway locomotives introduced in 1904
Standard gauge steam locomotives of Great Britain
D n2 locomotives
Scrapped locomotives